The Palau scops owl or Palau owl (Otus podarginus) is a species of owl in the family Strigidae. Palau scops owls are dark reddish-brown with small white dots scattered across their feathers. They are endemic to the Palau Islands in the western Pacific, where they are found in woodland and lagoon trees, ravines and mangrove swamps. Palau owls nest in hollows of trees, live in groups and are territorial.

The Palau scops owl was formerly placed in the monotypic genus Pyrroglaux. It was moved to Otus based on the results of a molecular phylogenetic study published in 2019.

References

Palau scops owl
Birds of Palau
Endemic fauna of Palau
Endemic birds of Palau
Palau scops owl
Taxonomy articles created by Polbot
Taxobox binomials not recognized by IUCN